Antonio de Monroy, O.P. or Antonio de Monroy y Hijar (6 July 1634 – 7 November 1715) was a Roman Catholic prelate who served as Archbishop of Santiago de Compostela (1685–1715), Bishop of Michoacán (1680) and the Master of the Order of Preachers (1677–1686).

Biography
Antonio de Monroy was born in Santiago de Querétaro, México and ordained a priest in the Order of Preachers. He served as a missionary in Mexico and later represented Mexico at the Dominican chapter of 1677 where he encouraged the Rosary Confraternities. In 1677, he was appointed Master General of Order of Friars Preachers. The probabilist controversy raged during his mastership. On 4 June 1685, he was appointed during the papacy of Pope Innocent XI as Archbishop of Santiago de Compostela. on 11 June 1685, he was consecrated bishop by Paluzzo Paluzzi Altieri Degli Albertoni, Cardinal-Priest of Santa Maria in Trastevere. In 1686, he resigned as Master General of Order of Friars Preachers. He served as Archbishop of Santiago de Compostela until his death on 7 November 1715. While bishop, he was the principal consecrator of Vincenzo Ludovico Gotti, Titular Patriarch of Jerusalem (1688).

References

External links and additional sources
 (for Chronology of Bishops) 
 (for Chronology of Bishops) 
 (for Chronology of Bishops) 
 (for Chronology of Bishops) 

Spanish Dominicans
Dominican bishops
18th-century Roman Catholic archbishops in Spain
Masters of the Order of Preachers
Bishops appointed by Pope Innocent XI
1634 births
1715 deaths
17th-century Roman Catholic bishops in Mexico
17th-century Roman Catholic archbishops in Spain